D'erlanger (stylized as D'ERLANGER) is a Japanese rock band from Kyoto Prefecture, formed in 1983 by guitarist Cipher and bassist Seela. While they originally played speed and power metal, after recruiting drummer Tetsu and vocalist Kyo they switched to an alternative rock sound for their debut album La Vie En Rose in 1989. Although it was on an indie label, it sold out and was reissued three times that year, earning them a major label record deal with BMG Japan the following year. They released Basilisk in March 1990 and it reached the top five on the charts. However, in December the group suddenly announced their disbandment.

Despite their short time in the spotlight, D'erlanger remain well-known and are considered one of the founders of visual kei. They reunited in 2007 and released the album Lazzaro, with a new harder sound that adds a gothic rock feel. They have since released six more studio albums and toured extensively, including several overseas performances.

History

Formation to disbandment: 1983–1990

D'erlanger was formed in December 1983 by Cipher and Seela on guitar and bass respectively.  Vocalist Kaoru and drummer Shi-Do, from the same high school, soon joined to complete the line-up. They had their first performance in May 1984 at the Osaka Bourbon House, when Cipher was just sixteen years old. In August 1984, Kaoru left the band and was replaced by Dizzy.

They released 3 demo tapes by 1985, "Tonight", "The Birth of Splendid Beast!!" and "Blue". On October 26, 1986 they participated in an event at Meguro Rokumeikan, called The New Power Metal Audition. Which was organized by Mandrake Root Records to celebrate the first anniversary of the independent label. D'erlanger won the contest and the label released their single "Girl" on February 20, 1987, it was limited to 3000 copies. They also appeared on the live omnibus album Hungry Days, with the song "Like a Beast". They then distributed another demo tape for free on February 22, it contained only "Sadistic Emotion".

On August 1, 1987, D'erlanger had their first one-man concert at Meguro Rokumeikan. Soon after Shi-Do decided to leave the band, he was replaced by Tetsu, who was a roadie for 44Magnum alongside Cipher, in October. Dizzy then left the band in June 1988 and Kyo, who had previously played with Tetsu in the short-lived Dead Wire and in Saver Tiger, became their new vocalist on July 1. In addition to Cipher and Tetsu's connection to 44Magnum, Kyo was also influenced by them and their lead singer Paul.

After their first show with Kyo on July 22, they went on their Sadistical Punk Tour. While touring in 1989, they released their first album La Vie En Rose, with Danger Crue Records on February 10. All copies were sold out just by pre-orders, so they released another press eleven days later. The album's sound was a drastic departure from their previous material, being punk and alternative rock instead of the speed and power metal they originally had. The band then went on the short Incarnation of Eroticism Tour.

The year 1990 started off with the band signing to the major label Ariola, at the time a sub label of BMG. During their Ai to Shi to Koh-Kotsu Tour at the beginning of 1990, they released their first major single, "Darlin'" on January 25. On March 7, they released their second album Basilisk. They released the single "Lullaby -1990-" before starting the Moon and the Memories Tour on September 10. The tour ended on October 31, at Koseinenkin Kaikan in Osaka.

On December 24, 1990, D'erlanger shocked their fans by suddenly announcing that they had disbanded. A home video and two separate live albums entitled Moon and the Memories... the Eternities Last Live 1 and 2 were released on March 6, 1991. All of which were recorded from their penultimate concerts on October 27 and 28, 1990 at Hibiya Open-Air Concert Hall in Tokyo. On April 21, 1995, both their studio albums were remastered and re-released. In 2020, Danger Crue Records founder Masahiro Oishi said that D'erlanger broke up due to poor management.

Reunited: 2007–2012

On March 14, 2007, the greatest hits album and DVD Pandora was released. Also released that same day on Cutting Edge, a sub label of Avex Group, was D'erlanger's first release of new material in 17 years, their third album Lazzaro. On April 22, they played their "rejuvenation performance" entitled Bara Iro no Sekai - Rosy Eyesight at Zepp Tokyo, which was released on DVD on September 19. On September 22, 2007, D'erlanger held Abstinence's Door #001, which was an event where themselves, Mucc and Merry performed.

They released the single "Zakuro" on March 19, 2008. It includes "Love Anymore", which was first composed by Cipher when he was sixteen years old and included on the "Blue" demo tape under the name "Telephon", with new lyrics by Kyo. The band released their fourth album The Price of Being a Rose is Loneliness on April 30. They then embarked on the D'erlanger Tour '08 -A Rose Insane- tour. The tour started on May 6 with the D'erlanger 25th Anniversary concert at the Nihon Budokan. Footage from this concert was released on December 10, as the Bara Iro no Jinsei -La Vie en Rose- DVD. D'erlanger held Abstinence's Door #002 on September 21, Inoran, Merry and heidi. performed. Abstinence's Door #003 was held on November 8, with the Underneath and La;Cen-zhow. performing. The following day was Abstinence's Door #004, where lynch., Sadie and the Underneath performed.

On July 25, 2009 they played in Taipei, Taiwan. It was the band's first performance in a foreign country. D'erlanger performed at the V-Rock Festival '09 on October 24, the show was broadcast live worldwide on the festival's official website. They also held a gig in South Korea on October 30. The band then released their fifth album, the self-titled D'erlanger, on November 11, 2009. The album includes a studio version of "Easy Make, Easy Mark", a song they wrote and played back in the '80s.

On September 19 and 20, 2010, Abstinence's Door #005 and Abstinence's Door #006 took place. Head Phones President, defspiral and Girugamesh performed the first night, whereas Acid Android and Pia performed the second night. Each concert was streamed worldwide live on Ustream.tv. Abstinence's Door #007 was held three days later in Taipei, with Taiwanese band Overdose and Korean Pia performing.

D'erlanger announced they would release an album entitled A Fabulous Thing in Rose, on September 29, 2010. It contains eleven tracks: 8 self-cover versions of songs from their first 2 studio albums, an English version of "La Vie En Rose", plus the new tracks "Everything is Nothing" (a song they wrote and played back in the '80s) and the instrumental "Adameve". It is available in two versions. The regular edition only includes the three "best tracks": "XXX for You", "Zakuro" and "Angelic Poetry" (which were selected from the three albums released after their comeback), and the "bonus track: "Dummy Blue (English Lyrics)". Whereas the limited edition includes the same three "best tracks", the three "bonus tracks": "Dummy Blue (English Lyrics)", "La Vie En Rose" and "An Aphrodisiac (Trance Rock Remix)", a special book, a 64-page photobook, a poster and more.

On December 13, it was announced on their official website that D'erlanger would be performing in Moscow, Russia at the XO-Club on April 30, 2011. However, on March 29, after the 2011 Tōhoku earthquake and tsunami that occurred on March 11 in Japan, the band decided to postpone the show until a new date can be announced. This would have been the band's first concert in a European country. They once again returned to Taiwan, this time for a performance at the Hohaiyan Rock Festival on July 15, 2012. D'erlanger covered "Iconoclasm" for Parade II -Respective Tracks of Buck-Tick-, a tribute album to Buck-Tick, and participated on the album's tour Buck-Tick Fest 2012 On Parade on September 23.

Warner Music Japan: 2013–present

D'erlanger released their sixth studio album, #Sixx, on May 22, 2013. It was their first release since switching record labels from Cutting Edge to Warner Music Japan. They covered hide's song "Genkai Haretsu" for Tribute VII -Rock Spirits-, released in December 2013. 2014 saw a continuation of the sixth album's tour, titled #Sixx-69-. Their next album, Spectacular Nite -Kuruoshii Yoru ni Tsuite-, followed on April 22, 2015. On May 2 D'erlanger began a nationwide tour in celebration of their 25th anniversary that finished on June 14 at Akasaka Blitz. They also performed at the second day of Luna Sea's Lunatic Fest on June 28, as well as at Angelo's annual Intersection of Dogma concert on August 5.

The group released J'aime La Vie on May 3, 2017, which became their highest-charting studio album since reuniting. They also began celebrating the 10th anniversary of their reunion. A tribute album to the band called D'erlanger Tribute Album ~Stairway to Heaven~ was released on September 13, 2017. It contains covers of their songs by acts such as Dir en Grey, Hyde, Teru and Hisashi, and Psycho le Cému. D'erlanger then hosted and performed at Abstinence's Door #008 and #009 at EX Theater Roppongi on September 15 and 16. The first included Angelo and Dezert, the second saw lynch. and Psycho le Cému perform, while D'erlanger performed with Hyde the first night and Kiyoharu the second.

The band held Abstinence's Door #010 on April 20, 2019 with Merry and Cali Gari. D'erlanger released their ninth album Roneve on May 22. It was supported by a fifteen-date nationwide tour from May to July.

On September 14, 2021, D'erlanger announced the postponement of their nationwide Agito Tour, which was set to begin later in the month, so that Kyo could have a tumor on his lung removed. D'erlanger performed at the Jack in the Box 2021 event on December 27. The three instrumentalists in the band were first joined by Tatsurou (Mucc) and Hyde on vocals for a song each, before returning to the stage later in the show with Kyo for one song. The Agito tour eventually took place between March and July 2022 and celebrated the 15th anniversary of the band's reunion. D'erlanger performed on August 27 at the So no Sekai event hosted by Arlequin. Their anniversary celebration continued with five shows at Veats Shibuya under the title Sadistical Punk 2022 between September and November.

Legacy

D'erlanger are often credited as one of the founding acts of Japan's visual kei movement. Tomokazu Nishihiro of Real Sound wrote that by showing influence from metal, punk and early Japanese rock in their music, they affected the sound as well as the image of visual kei. Kiyoharu said that, with band's like Boøwy and Buck-Tick being popular at the time, D'erlanger's mix of "beat rock" with metal was "shocking." Tomoyuki Hokari of OK Music also described their music as taking aspects from beat rock like Boøwy and mixing it with metal like 44Magnum. Nishihiro stated that D'erlanger are still held up as a unique band decades later because each member is distinct and unlike any other musician.

Kerrang! included Basilisk on a list of 13 essential Japanese rock and metal albums, writing that its songs "engulfed a generation with a burgeoning erogenous intensity the scene has seldom seen since." Inoran was influenced by D'erlanger as a teenager and has expressed particular admiration for Cipher on several occasions. His Luna Sea bandmate Shinya described D'erlanger as exemplifying all the elements of visual kei and praised Tetsu's drumming. Hyde looks up to D'erlanger, particularly Kyo, whose style he imitates. Dir en grey guitarist Die developed his love of the instrument from La Vie En Rose and called Cipher his "guitar hero." Mucc guitarist Miya has said that D'erlanger was the reason he started a band.

Members

The members of D'erlanger are credited exclusively by their mononymous stage names.
  – guitar, backing vocals 1983–1990, 2007–present (→Body, Craze)
  – bass, backing vocals 1983–1990, 2007–present (→Fix, Vinyl, Atomic Zaza, No Stars Innovation)
  – drums 1987–1990, 2007–present (ex:Rabbit, Dead Wire, Saver Tiger, Mephistopheles,→Zi:Kill, Body, Craze)
  – vocals 1988–1990, 2007–present (ex:Runaway Boys, Dead Wire, Saver Tiger, Ba-Ra,→Die in Cries, Bug)

Former members
  – vocals 1983–1984
  – drums 1983–1987
  – vocals 1984–1988 (→Strawberry Fields, Vinyl)

Discography

Albums

 La Vie En Rose (February 10, 1989), Oricon Albums Chart Peak Position: No. 25
 Basilisk (March 7, 1990) No. 5
 Lazzaro (March 14, 2007) No. 32
 The Price of Being a Rose is Loneliness (April 30, 2008) No. 22
 D'erlanger (November 11, 2009) No. 19
 #Sixx (May 22, 2013) No. 16
  No. 18
 J'aime La Vie (May 3, 2017) No. 14
 Roneve (May 22, 2019) No. 15

Live albums
 Moon and the Memories... the Eternities Last Live 1 (March 6, 1991) No. 5
 Moon and the Memories... the Eternities Last Live 2 (March 6, 1991) No. 7
 #Sixx -Discordantly- (December 18, 2013) No. 117
 D'erlanger Reunion 10th Anniversary Live 2017-2018 (September 12, 2018) No. 115

Other albums
 Pandora (March 14, 2007, greatest hits compilation with DVD) No. 54
 A Fabulous Thing in Rose (September 29, 2010, self-cover album) No. 26
 D'erlanger Tribute Album ~Stairway to Heaven~ (September 13, 2017, tribute album) No. 4

Singles

 "Girl" (February 20, 1987)
 "La Vie En Rose" (January 1989)
 "Darlin'" (January 25, 1990), Oricon Singles Chart Peak Position: No. 9
 "Lullaby -1990-" (September 5, 1990, cassette & CD contain different B-sides) No. 12
  No. 26

Demos
 "Tonight" (1984)
 "The Birth of Splendid Beast!!" (December 26, 1985)
 "Blue" (1985)
 "Sadistic Emotion" (February 22, 1987)

Home videos

 An Aphrodisiac (October 15, 1989)
 La Vie En Rose (October 28, 1989, given by lottery at a Hibiya Yagai Ongakudo gig)
 Incarnation of Eroticism ~Live at Hibiya Yaon~ (VHS: February 7, 1990, DVD: May 23, 2001)
 Kid's Blue PYX '90 SPR (March 1990, sold with a magazine)
 
 Moon and the Memories... the Eternities/Last Video (VHS: March 31, 1991, DVD: May 23, 2001)
 , Oricon DVDs Chart Peak Position: No. 16
  No. 36
 13e Cross Intoxication (March 24, 2010) No. 63
 Deep Inside of You (September 28, 2011, DVD & CD) No. 25
 #Sixx -Flick- (December 18, 2013) No. 51
 , Oricon Blu-rays Chart Peak Position: No. 19
 D'erlanger Reunion 10th Anniversary Live 2017-2018 (September 12, 2018) DVD: No. 46, Blu-Ray: 25

Notes

References

External links
 

Visual kei musical groups
Japanese hard rock musical groups
Japanese gothic rock groups
Japanese alternative rock groups
Japanese punk rock groups
Japanese power metal musical groups
Musical groups established in 1983
Musical groups disestablished in 1990
Musical groups reestablished in 2007
Musical quartets
Avex Group artists
Warner Music Japan artists
Musical groups from Kyoto Prefecture